Leif Åke Möller  (born April 11, 1958 in Lund, Sweden) is a retired Swedish Olympic sailor in the Star class. He competed in the 2000 Summer Olympics together with Mats Johansson, where they finished 13th.

References

Olympic sailors of Sweden
Swedish male sailors (sport)
Star class sailors
Sailors at the 2000 Summer Olympics – Star
1958 births
Living people
Sportspeople from Lund
20th-century Swedish people